Alfred Geary (8 August 1849 – 14 October 1911) was an Australian cricketer. He played five first-class matches for New South Wales between 1877/78 and 1882/83.

See also
 List of New South Wales representative cricketers

References

External links
 

1849 births
1911 deaths
Australian cricketers
New South Wales cricketers